Olympique de Marseille at least managed to become a midfield team in the 2001-02 French league season. Despite the mid-table mediocrity, l'OM still attracted more than 50.000 spectators on average, helping the clubs' mired economy getting out of the crisis.

Squad

Goalkeepers
  Vedran Runje
  Cédric Carrasso
  Damien Grégorini

Defenders
  Manuel Dos Santos
  Franck Leboeuf
  Daniel Van Buyten
  Fabien Laurenti
  Joseph Yobo
  Franck Jurietti
  Abdoulaye Méïté
  Zoumana Camara
  Camille Borios
  Eduardo Tuzzio
  Dimas Teixeira
  Stefano Torrisi

Midfielders
  Rivera
  Piotr Świerczewski
  Ibrahim Ba
  Jérôme Leroy
  André Luiz
  Brahim Hemdani
  Salomon Olembé
  Karim Dahou
  Fabrice Fernandes
  Wilfried Dalmat
  Djamel Belmadi
  Delfim

Attackers
  Ibrahima Bakayoko
  Lamine Sakho
  Cyril Chapuis
  Dill
  Pascal Nouma
  Alfonso
  Fernandão
  Guillaume Deschamps
  Adriano
  Jurgen Cavens

Competitions

Division 1

League table

Results summary

Results by round

Matches

Topscorers
  Ibrahima Bakayoko 8
  Lamine Sakho 5
  Alfonso 4
  Fernandão 3
  Franck Leboeuf 3

Sources
 RSSSF - France 2001/02

Olympique de Marseille seasons
Marseille